Brussard is a surname. Notable people with the name include:

Corina Brussaard, viral ecology scientist
Jan Brussaard (1875–1940), Dutch sport shooter
Jan Hendrik Brussaard (1899–1969), Dutch sports shooter

See also
Broussard, surname
Bussard, surname